The Alcalá 20 nightclub fire occurred 17 December 1983 at 4:45 a.m. at Alcalá 20, a nightclub at number 20 Calle de Alcalá in the centre of Madrid. There were 600 people in the club at the time; 82 people were killed and 27 injured. During the fire, an exit on one of the upper floors was locked, and a main exit to an adjoining building was closed with an iron grill.

The charred remains of the labyrinthine four story subterranean club remained intact but closed until 2003, when a major refurbishment was started. A remodelled two-story club, named Adraba, opened on the site in 2005 with improved fire safety. However it was closed down by city authorities after only three hours. In November 2007 the club was reopened, but was closed down once again within a few hours by the authorities. The club reopened under a new name in February 2010 after installing modern fire safety devices.

See also

2000 Luoyang Christmas fire

References

La música vuelve a sonar en Alcalá 20, El País.
El Ayuntamiento precinta la sala Alcalá 20, El Mundo.
La discoteca Alcalá 20 abre unas horas sin licencia del Ayuntamiento de Madrid, El Mundo.

1983 fires in Europe
Nightclub fires
Fire disasters involving barricaded escape routes
History of Madrid
1983 in Spain 
1983 disasters in Spain 
Calle de Alcalá
1980s in Madrid
Fires in Spain
December 1983 events in Europe